Dov Dori (born 2 September 1953) is an Israeli-American computer scientist, and Professor of Information Systems Engineering at Technion – Israel Institute of Technology, known for the development of Object Process Methodology (OPM). The ideas underlying OPM were published for the first time in 1995.

Biography 
Born in Haifa, Israel, Dori received his BS in Industrial Engineering and Management in 1975 at the Technion – Israel Institute of Technology. In 1981 he received his MS at the Tel Aviv University, Leon Recanati Graduate School of Business Administration, and in 1988 his PhD in Operations Research from the Weizmann Institute of Science under supervision of Amir Pnueli and Shimon Ullman.

Dori started his academic career in the United States as Assistant Professor in Computer Science at the University of Kansas in 1987. At the Technion, Israel Institute of Technology in the Faculty of Industrial Engineering and Management he was appointed Senior Lecturer in 1991, Associate Professor in 1999, and Professor in 2008. Since 2010 At the technion he also heads the Enterprise Systems Modeling Laboratory. Furthermore since 2000 he was Visiting Associate Professor and later Visiting Professor at the School of Engineering of the Massachusetts Institute of Technology.

Dori is known for the development of Object Process Methodology for which he received the Technion Klein Research Award and the Hershel Rich Innovation Award. He is IEEE Fellow since 2017, International Association for Pattern Recognition (IAPR) Fellow since 2000, ACM Senior Member since 2006, and INCOSE Fellow since 2011. He has published in the fields of conceptual modeling of complex systems, systems architecture and design.

Selected publications 
1980s 
 
 

1990s 
 
 
 

2000s 
 
 
 
 
 

 
 

2010s

References

External links 
 
 
 

1953 births
Living people
American computer scientists
Israeli computer scientists
Technion – Israel Institute of Technology alumni
Tel Aviv University alumni
Weizmann Institute of Science alumni
Fellows of the International Association for Pattern Recognition